

Events

January events
 January 1 – The Cincinnati, Hamilton and Dayton Railway,  Indiana, Columbus and Eastern and the Lima-Toledo Railroad merge to form the Cincinnati and Lake Erie Railroad
 January 31 – Trains begin using the new elevated tracks and platform at Toronto Union Station.

February events
 February 15 – The Compagnie Internationale des Wagons-Lits operates the first Taurus Express between Istanbul and Baghdad, with road connection between Nusaybin and Kirkuk.
 February 18 – The Pullman Company buys the Osgood Bradley Car Company, which has been making trolley and other transit cars since 1833.
 February 24 – The Standard Steel Car Company is incorporated as a Pullman subsidiary.

March events 
 March 13–14 – Blue Train Races: Woolf Barnato driving his Speed Six Blue Train Bentley saloon races Le Train Bleu from Cannes. He is parked at his London club before the train arrives at Calais Gare Maritime.
 March 29 – last scheduled train runs on the narrow gauge Northwestern Pacific Railroad.
 March 30 – Chesapeake and Ohio Railroad inaugurates The Sportsman passenger service.

April events
 April 21 – The Turkestan–Siberia Railway is completed.

May events
 May 6 – The Drammen Line in Norway takes electric traction into use between Drammen and Brakerøya.

June events
 June 1 – The Great Indian Peninsula Railway introduces the Deccan Queen express over its newly-electrified line between Bombay (Mumbai) and Poonah (Pune).
 June 16 – Hanwa Electronic Railway, Tennoji Station of Osaka to Wakayama Station route officially complete in Japan.(a predecessor of JR Hanwa Line)
 June 20 – General Motors purchases Winton Engine, a major supplier of diesel locomotive prime movers.
 June 25 – The Glacier Express first runs between St. Moritz and Zermatt in Switzerland following completion of the metre gauge link between Brig and Visp.

July events
 July – The Atlantic City Railroad (a predecessor of the Pennsylvania-Reading Seashore Lines) purchases the Wildwood and Delaware Bay Short Line Railroad.
 July 8 – A demonstration Bennie Railplane monorail line is opened over an existing railway line at Milngavie near Glasgow in Scotland.

August events 

October events
October 1 – Somu Railroad Line, Ōmiya Station (Saitama) via Kasukabe and Kashiwa to Funabashi route is officially completed in Japan (as predecessor of the Tobu Urban Park Line (Noda Line)).

December events
 December 18 – Bombay Central station opened by Bombay, Baroda and Central India Railway.
 December 31 – General Motors buys Electro-Motive Corporation and combines it with Winton Engine to form General Motors Electro-Motive Division.

November events
 Southern Pacific Railroad opens the Benicia–Martinez drawbridge — it  replaces the Solano, the largest rail ferryboat ever constructed.

Unknown date events
 General American Transportation Corporation assumes ownership of Swift Refrigerator Line.

Births

February births 
 February 3 – Charles S. Roberts, American railroad historian, is born (d. 2010).

Unknown date births 
 Robert Bandeen, president of Canadian National Railway 1974-1982.

Deaths

References